Julie Halard-Decugis (born 10 September 1970) is a French former professional tennis player.

Tennis career
Halard-Decugis lived in La Baule, France, during the initial stages of her career and later moved to Pully, Switzerland. She turned professional in 1986. She won the French Open junior singles title in 1988 and was the Wimbledon junior singles runner-up in 1987. She retired from the WTA Tour tennis circuit at the end of the 2000 season. Her highest WTA Tour singles and doubles rankings was number seven and number one respectively. She had been coached by Arnaud Decugis since 1989.

Halard-Decugis won her first WTA Tour singles title in Puerto Rico. She enjoyed her best season in 1996, when she won her first WTA Tour Tier II singles title in Paris and finished the year with a career-high season-ending singles ranking of No. 15 and as the No. 1 singles player from France. This occurred despite the fact that her playing schedule in the second half of 1996 was curtailed because of a wrist injury sustained during the Fed Cup semifinal match against Spain. She only played two tournaments in late 1997 because of injuries.

By winning the singles title in Rosmalen in 1998, she became the 20th player to have won singles titles on all four surfaces in the Open Era. Halard also won the singles and doubles titles in Pattaya that year, and broke into the top 10 singles ranking in August 1999, becoming the fifth Frenchwoman after Françoise Dürr, Mary Pierce, Nathalie Tauziat and Amélie Mauresmo to do so. In 1999, she won WTA Tour singles titles in Auckland and Birmingham and was runner-up on three other occasions. Between 15 November 1999 and 9 January 2000, Julie Halard, Nathalie Tauziat, Amélie Mauresmo and Mary Pierce were all ranked inside the singles top 10, the first time France had four players ranked among the singles top 10.

2000 was to be the final and perhaps the finest year of Halard's professional playing career. She reached the Australian Open singles quarterfinal for the second time, captured the second WTA Tour Tier II title of her career in Eastbourne and reached her career-high singles ranking of No. 7 in February. Halard was also runner-up in Tokyo's Princess Cup in October and won the doubles title with Ai Sugiyama. The following week, she won both the singles and doubles titles at the Japan Open in Tokyo, saving three match points in the final to defeat the defending champion Amy Frazier.

On her 30th birthday, Halard won the 2000 US Open women's doubles title with Ai Sugiyama, her only Grand Slam title as a professional. The pair also reached the final at Wimbledon, the semifinal at the French Open and  the quarterfinal at the Australian Open that year. Halard-Decugis won nine other doubles titles in 2000, five of them with Sugiyama, and became the first Frenchwoman to attain the No. 1 doubles ranking in the Open Era. Halard-Decugis represented her country in the Federation Cup Fed Cup from 1990 to 2000 and in the Olympic Games in 1992 and 2000.

Personal life
She married her coach, Arnaud Decugis, on 22 September 1995. Arnaud Decugis is the great nephew of Max Decugis, a leading tennis player from France during the early 20th century. The couple have three children

Grand Slam finals

Doubles: 2 (1 title, 1 runner-up)

WTA career finals

Singles: 21 (12 titles, 9 runner-ups)

Doubles: 25 (15 titles, 10 runner-ups)

ITF Circuit finals

Singles: 2 (2–0)

Doubles: 4 (2–2)

Grand Slam performance timelines

Singles

Doubles

Head-to-head records
Arantxa Sánchez Vicario 4—8
Dominique Monami 2—2
Serena Williams 0—4
Martina Hingis 0—5
Venus Williams 1—1
Anna Kournikova 1—1
Elena Dementieva 1—0
Jelena Dokic 1—0
Steffi Graf 1—9
Lindsay Davenport 2—9
Mary Pierce 3-0

References

External links
 
 
 

1970 births
French expatriate sportspeople in Switzerland
French female tennis players
French Open junior champions
Hopman Cup competitors
Living people
Olympic tennis players of France
Sportspeople from Loire-Atlantique
People from Lavaux-Oron District
Sportspeople from Versailles, Yvelines
Tennis players at the 1992 Summer Olympics
Tennis players at the 2000 Summer Olympics
US Open (tennis) champions
Grand Slam (tennis) champions in women's doubles
Grand Slam (tennis) champions in girls' singles
WTA number 1 ranked doubles tennis players
ITF World Champions